Craig is a surname, derived from the Scottish Gaelic creag.  The word craig (Anglicised to crag) refers to a small, rocky hill in Scottish English.

Notable people sharing this surname 

Albert Craig (disambiguation)  
Alfred M. Craig (1832–1911), American jurist
Alisa Craig, a pen name of Charlotte MacLeod (1922-2005)
Allan Craig (born 1904), Scottish footballer
Allen Craig (born 1984), American Major League baseballer
Angie Craig (born 1972), American politician
Amanda Craig (born 1959), British author
Ann Craig, English silversmith
Carl Craig (politician) (1878–1957), American politician
Caroline Craig (born 1975), Australian actress
Charles Craig (disambiguation) 
Charles C. Craig (1865–1944), American jurist and legislator
Charles L. Craig (1872-1935), American New York City Comptroller
Charlotte Craig (born 1991), American Taekwondo practitioner
Daniel Craig (born 1968), English actor
Daniel F. Craig (1875-1929), American military officer
David Craig (author), pseudonymous British author publishing in 2005
Edward Gordon Craig (1872–1966), English theatre practitioner
Elijah Craig (died 1808), American preacher
Elizabeth Craig (writer) (1883–1980), British chef
Elizabeth Craig, New Zealand politician
Elizabeth A. Craig, American biochemist and geneticist
Sir Ernest Craig, 1st Baronet (1859–1933), British Conservative Party politician
Frank Barrington Craig (1902-1951), British artist
Fred Craig (footballer) (born 1881), played for Plymouth Argyle
F. W. S. Craig (1929–1989), Scottish politician
Gordon A. Craig (1913–2005), Scottish-American historian
Harmon Craig (1926–2003), American geochemist
Hector Craig (1775-1842), Congressman from New York
Irwin Craig (died 1970), American juror
James Craig (disambiguation)
Jenny Craig (born 1932), American entrepreneur
Joe Craig (disambiguation)
John Craig (disambiguation)
John Manson Craig (1896–1970), Scottish soldier
Judy Craig (born 1946), American singer
Larry Craig (born 1945), American politician
Locke Craig (1860–1925), American politician
Lyman C. Craig (1906-1974), American chemist
Malin Craig (1875–1945), American general
Mary Lynde Craig (1834-1921), American writer, teacher, attorney, activist
Mikey Craig (born 1960), British DJ and musician
Neil Craig (born 1956), Australian rules footballer and coach
Paco Craig (born 1965), American football player
Paul Craig, American ballet dancer
Philip Craig (disambiguation)
Ralph Craig (1889–1972), American track and field athlete
Richard Craig (disambiguation)
Robert Craig (disambiguation)
Rod Craig (1958–2013), American baseball player
Roger Craig (American football) (born 1960), American football player
Roger Craig (baseball) (born 1930), American baseball player
Ryan Craig (born 1982), Canadian ice hockey player
Ryan Craig (playwright) (born 1972), British playwright
Stephen Craig (bobsleigh) (born 1967), Australian bobsledder
Steven Craig (born 1981), Scottish footballer
Tommy Craig, (born 1950), Scottish footballer
Thomas Craig (actor) (born 1962), English actor
Thomas Craig (poet) (c.1538-1608), Scottish jurist and poet
Thomas Dixon Craig (1842–1905), Canadian politician
Walter H. Craig (1880-1937), American politician
Wendy Craig (born 1934), English actress
Will Craig (born 1994), American baseball player
William Craig (logician) (born 1918), American logician
William Craig (Northern Ireland politician) (born 1924), Northern Irish politician
William Grindley Craig (1818-1886), British locomotive engineer
William Lane Craig (born 1949), American philosopher
William Marshall Craig (died 1827), English painter
Winston Craig (born 1995), American football player
Yvonne Craig (1937–2015), American actress

Notable fictional characters sharing this surname
Brett Craig, from the television series Kath and Kim
Harriet Craig, main character of the film Harriet Craig starring Joan Crawford
John Craig (fictional agent), hero of spy thrillers by James Munro
Kim Craig, from the television series Kath and Kim
Dr. Mark Craig, from the television series St. Elsewhere

See also
Craig (given name)

English-language surnames
Surnames of Scottish origin
Surnames of Irish origin